"House of Love" is a song by British boy band East 17, released in August 1992 as their debut single from their first studio album, Walthamstow (1993). The song became a number-one hit in Finland, Israel, and Sweden, and was a top-40 hit in several other countries between 1992 and 1994. In the UK, it peaked at number ten. Two different music videos were produced to promote the single.

Background
Initially conceived by former Pet Shop Boys manager Tom Watkins as a tougher version of Take That, East 17 decided that their first single—like Take That's debut—should be an upbeat dance number that would sell to both teenagers and to clubs. Inspired by current dance groups like The KLF and Snap!, Tony Mortimer wrote "House of Love" as a mock 'rave' anthem, complete with a 'harmony' rap performed by Brian Harvey. Mortimer rapped the main verses with the entire band singing the chorus. The Pedigree Mix of the song, complete with an explosion and then a dog barking at the beginning and the end, was released as the single, complete with a low-budget video. 

"House of Love" shot to No. 10 on the UK Singles Chart, establishing East 17 as a premier pop act. It was included on their first album, Walthamstow, and their 1996 greatest hits compilation. On 15 April 2011, T-Mobile uploaded a video parody of the JK Wedding Entrance Dance portraying the wedding of Prince William and Kate Middleton weeks before the actual Royal Wedding using choreography with the group's song.

Critical reception
Adam Sweeting from The Guardian remarked that the band "take aim at the dance floor" on the song. David Bennun from Melody Maker wrote, "...and East 17, a posse of hippety-hoppety wee whippersnappers, lamenting the decline of Mother Earth in the most simplistically eco-conscious manner imaginable." Neil Spencer from The Observer said the song "prove the more inane offerings from a mix of junior hip-hop and melodic pop". Carl Fysh from Seventeen declared it as an "hard-hitting house anthem". Tom Doyle from Smash Hits gave it four out of five, commenting, "Looking a bit like a cross between Take That and Flowered Up in their trendy Essex techno gear, E17 [sic] come up with this well catchy tune with background barking supplied by their dog".

Rolling Stone ranked the song at number 75 in their list of 75 Greatest Boy Band Songs of All Time in 2020.

Music video
There were made two different music videos for the song: a European and an American version. The latter was directed by Scott Kennedy.

Track listings

 UK CD and cassette single
 "House of Love" (Pedigree mix)
 "House of Love" (Son of a Bitch mix)
 "House of Love" (Glossy Coat mix)
 "House of Love" (Wet Nose mix)

 UK 7-inch single, French and Japanese single
A. "House of Love" (Pedigree mix) – 4:37
B. "House of Love" (The Expedient demo) – 7:43

 UK 12-inch single
A1. "House of Love" (Son of a Bitch mix)
A2. "House of Love" (Glossy Coat mix)
B1. "House of Love" (Wet Nose mix)

 US 12-inch single
 "House of Love" (Son of a Bitch mix) — 9:02
 "House of Love" (Wet Nose mix) — 6:04
 "House of Love" (Murk's main mix) — 6:41
 "House of Love" (Oscar G's Dope dub) — 6:45

 US cassette single
A. "House of Love" (Pedigree mix) — 4:37
B. "House of Love" (Son of a Bitch mix) — 9:02

 Australian CD and cassette single
 "House of Love" (Pedigree mix)
 "House of Love" (Wet Nose mix)

Charts

Weekly charts

Year-end charts

Certifications

References

External links
 House of Love music video on YouTube
 Alternate House of Love music video on YouTube

1991 songs
1992 debut singles
East 17 songs
Hip house songs
London Records singles
Number-one singles in Finland
Number-one singles in Israel
Number-one singles in Sweden
Songs written by Tony Mortimer